The 2000 Thurrock Council election took place on 4 May 2000 to elect members of Thurrock Council in Essex, England. One third of the council was up for election and the Labour party stayed in overall control of the council.

After the election, the composition of the council was
Labour 38
Conservative 10
Vacant 1

Election result

Ward results

References

2000
2000 English local elections
2000s in Essex